Chislehurst was a parliamentary constituency in what is now the London Borough of Bromley.  It returned one Member of Parliament (MP)  to the House of Commons of the Parliament of the United Kingdom.

The constituency was created for the 1918 general election, and abolished for the 1997 general election, when it was partly replaced by the new Bromley and Chislehurst constituency. From 1885, most of the area of this constituency had been included in the Sevenoaks seat.

Boundaries 

1918–1945: The Urban Districts of Chislehurst and Foot's Cray, the Rural District of Bromley, and part of the Rural District of Dartford.

1945–1950: The Urban Districts of Chislehurst, and Sidcup and Swanscombe, and part of the Rural District of Dartford.

1950–1974: The Urban Districts of Chislehurst and Sidcup.

1974–1997: The London Borough of Bromley wards of Bickley, Chislehurst, Mottingham, Plaistow and Sundridge, and St Paul's Cray.

Members of Parliament

Elections

Elections in the 1990s

Elections in the 1980s

Elections in the 1970s

Elections in the 1960s

Elections in the 1950s

Elections in the 1940s

Elections in the 1930s

Elections in the 1920s

Elections in the 1910s

See also
List of parliamentary constituencies in London

References

Parliamentary constituencies in London (historic)
Constituencies of the Parliament of the United Kingdom established in 1918
Constituencies of the Parliament of the United Kingdom disestablished in 1997
Politics of the London Borough of Bromley
History of the London Borough of Bromley
Chislehurst